Citytv is a Bulgarian cable and satellite music channel. It was launched in October 2005 as the TV sister channel of Radio City (Bulgaria). Its output includes predominantly current videos by international pop, dance and R&B artists and selected original shows, including The Big 50, Tuborg Rewind, WebHit, Hot Spot and others.

External links
Official website
Communicorp website
Predavatel - info site in Bulgarian

References 

Television networks in Bulgaria
Bulgarian-language television stations
Music television channels
Mass media in Sofia
Television channels and stations established in 2005
Music organizations based in Bulgaria